'Kleptocracy Tour' refers to tours of cities where financial flows from kleptocracies are being used to purchase residential property as a means of  money-laundering.

The concept was founded by anti-corruption campaigners, started in London in February, 2016 and was modelled on the 'Beverly Hills-type tours of the homes of the stars'. The first tour focussed on properties owned by Russian, Ukrainian and Kazakh klepto-oligarchs congruent with the founders original area of expertise and awareness. The  tour garnered widespread press coverage  and sparked strong interest in subsequent tours in London and abroad.

The tours began in early February 2016, after the campaign for a public registry documenting the ultimate beneficial owners of London's offshore companies was rejected. They are organised by the campaign group 'ClampK' which highlights both the local economic distortions  caused by these capital inflows and the implicit corruption implied by facilitating this money-laundering by foreign kleptocrats. The tour is planned for expansion in Miami and New York City.

See also
City Sightseeing
Real estate in the United Kingdom

References

Money laundering
Anti-corruption activism
Corruption in Ukraine
Political corruption
Corruption in Russia
Tourism in London